Eolocustopsidae is an extinct family of grasshoppers in the order Orthoptera. There are at least two genera and two described species in Eolocustopsidae.

Genera
These two genera belong to the family Eolocustopsidae:
 † Eolocustopsis Riek, 1976
 † Protettavus Riek, 1976

References

Caelifera